Tarcisio Catanese (6 September 1967 –  2 March 2017) was an Italian professional football midfielder who was later involved in the sport as a manager.

He played in Serie A for many years and amassed 79 appearances in two spells at Parma F.C., where he later became a youth coach. He then worked as head coach of Trapani in the Serie D league, and as a scout in his native Sicily for Juventus.

In July 2011 he was hired by U.S. Città di Palermo as head of the Allievi Nazionali under-17 team. He was replaced by Rosario Compagno, his predecessor at the same role, later in July 2012.

References

External links
Profile at lega-calcio.it

1967 births
2017 deaths
Association football midfielders
Italian footballers
Footballers from Palermo
Serie A players
Serie B players
Serie C players
S.S.C. Napoli players
Reggina 1914 players
Parma Calcio 1913 players
Bologna F.C. 1909 players
Cosenza Calcio 1914 players
A.C. Reggiana 1919 players
Ravenna F.C. players
A.C. Ancona players
Como 1907 players
U.S. Cremonese players